The Carib Theatre, also known as the Carib 5, is a cinema in northern Kingston, Jamaica. Opened in 1938, it has been owned and operated by the Palace Amusement Company since ca. 1939. The Carib was the largest and highest-grossing theatre in the West Indies, and was once Jamaica's largest building. It served as a one-screen facility until a 1996 fire and 1997 renovation/conversion into a five-screen multiplex.

History
Development on the Carib Theatre began in August 1937, when Jamaican businessman B.M. Andrade made a deal with Metro-Goldwyn-Mayer (MGM) to build an upscale, state-of-the-art movie theatre in Kingston. Designed by Boston University graduate John Pike, the facility was constructed as a rival to Kingston's older Palace Theatre, operated by Audley Morais, and would secure exclusive deals with MGM and 20th-Century Fox. "As the manager of the Carib  explained later, 'MGM realised that if their films were even to be shown in Jamaica either the price would have to be reduced or the theatre monopoly would have to be broken. The MGM people decided upon the latter course.'"

The Cinema Company of Jamaica Ltd. opened the Carib at 9:00 a.m. local time on 13 April 1938; the first film to be screened there was MGM's The Firefly at 10:00 a.m. The Jamaica Gleaner declared the opening "the film event of the decade... Rarely, if ever, have Kingston and St. Andrew film-fans seen such a day." The theatre, Jamaica's largest building upon its opening, became Morais' first rival in 25 years; as the MGM and Fox titles came to the island, manager Morris Cargill wrote that "this did not come about without generating large amounts of bad blood on all sides." "Faced with competition for his best customers—the middle and upper classes of Kingston," Morais bought the Carib through his Palace Amusement Company just before World War II.

Of its architecture, John F. Allen of High Performance Stereo (HPS) and the Carib's then-manager Douglas Graham respectively wrote in October 1982 (for BoxOffice magazine) and October 1990:

In the late 1940s, the Palace Amusement Co. was acquired by the J. Arthur Rank company; by 1954, the Carib's proscenium was removed to make way for a 58-foot screen accommodating CinemaScope films. In June 1972, the facility was host to the premiere of Perry Henzell's The Harder They Come, where its opening-night audience of 5,000 exceeded the seating capacity of 1,800. In addition to showing movies, the Carib also hosted various live musical and stage events over the years.

In 1982, John F. Allen of High Performance Stereo (HPS) installed the first computer-designed theatrical sound system at the Carib, profiled in two BoxOffice magazine articles (in October 1982 and February 1991). This system, the HPS-4000, also brought four-track Dolby Stereo sound to the theatre— "powered by 6000 watts of BGW amplifiers"— and also featured "a surround array of 24 speakers, enhanced delay mechanism, and Klipsch TMCM-3 stage speakers". The Klipsch equipment was upgraded in 1986, and Dolby SR was phased in by 1988.

Starting in the early 1980s, the Carib competed with the Regal, another Kingston theatre situated several hundred yards away. As audiences increasingly turned to the Carib and its sound system, the Regal closed and became a shopping centre. Eventually, the Carib became the highest-grossing theatre in the West Indies, and remained its largest such facility.

On 21 September 1996, the theatre was consumed by fire. "Starting in the auditorium's ceiling," recounted Allen, "the fire spread rapidly throughout the structure and turned the theatre into a smoldering ruin in just three hours." One firefighter, 26-year-old Lambert Blackwood, was Jamaica's first to be killed in a fire; another two were injured. Also injured was Douglas Graham, "one of the heirs to his father's [Palace] company". Graham spent one week in a local hospital after suffering from smoke inhalation while helping the firefighters.

In the months after the fire, the Carib was renovated and split into five auditoriums. Although the walls were retained, the original single-screen facility was deemed too expensive to be rebuilt. On 24 June 1997, it reopened as the Carib 5.

On 1 July 2009, Ice Age: Dawn of the Dinosaurs was the first film to be shown in 3D at the Carib.

Amenities
The Carib was the British West Indies' first building to offer air conditioning upon its opening. During World War II, two parking lots stood next to the theatre—one for motor vehicles, and another for "animal powered traffic—bicycles and buggies."

As a single-screen outlet, it was noted for its acoustics:

See also
Cinema of Jamaica

References

General

Specific

Further reading

External links
Cinema Treasures

Buildings and structures in Kingston, Jamaica
Cinemas and movie theaters
1938 establishments in Jamaica